Gioacchino Criaco (Africo, 3 March 1965) is an Italian writer.

Life
Gioacchino Criaco was born in Africo, Calabria, to a family of shepherds. He went to a high school in Locri and studied laws in Bologna. He worked as a lawyer in Milan until 2008, when his literary career took off.

His brother, Pietro Criaco is a member of the 'Ndrangheta and he lost his father in a vendetta in 1993.

The movie director Francesco Munzi adapted his debut novel  Anime nere in 2014: Black Souls.

Works
 Anime nere,  2008
 Zefira, 2009
 American Taste, 2011
 Perduta gente, 2012
 Il Saltozoppo, 2015
 L'agenda ritrovata, 2017
La memoria del lupo, 2017
 La maligredi, 2018

References

1965 births
Living people
21st-century Italian male writers
21st-century Italian novelists